James Perry Goodbody (22 March 1877 – 21 March 1952) was an Irish politician. He was an independent member of Seanad Éireann from 1922 to 1928. From County Limerick, he was nominated to the Seanad by the President of the Executive Council in 1922 for 6 years. He did not contest the 1928 Seanad election.

References

1877 births
1952 deaths
Independent members of Seanad Éireann
Members of the 1922 Seanad
Members of the 1925 Seanad
Politicians from County Limerick